Paul Kenneth Burstow (born 13 May 1962) is a British former politician who served as the Liberal Democrat Member of Parliament for Sutton and Cheam for 18 years, from 1997 to 2015, when he was defeated by Paul Scully.

He was appointed Minister of State at the Department of Health in May 2010, and served in that position until September 2012.

Early life
Burstow was born in Carshalton in Surrey, son of a tailor, and was educated at Glastonbury High School for Boys, a former boys' secondary modern school in Carshalton, followed by Carshalton College and the South Bank Polytechnic, where he obtained a degree in business studies. He started his career as a buying assistant with Allied Shoe Repairs in 1985. The following year he worked briefly in print sales with KallKwik Printers, before becoming a research assistant at the London Borough of Hounslow in 1987.

Politics before parliament
He was elected as a councillor for the Social Democratic Party (SDP) to the Sutton Borough Council in 1986, and was its deputy leader from 1994 to 1997. Burstow remained a councillor for the Rosehill ward in Sutton until 2002, after his election to Parliament.

In 1988, he joined the Association of Liberal Democrat Councillors as a campaigns officer; he then became its political secretary in 1996, where he remained until becoming an MP.

Election and parliamentary career
Burstow first contested the Sutton and Cheam Parliamentary seat for the Liberal Democrats at the 1992 General Election. He was defeated by the Conservative Lady Olga Maitland despite achieving one of the largest swings to the Liberal Democrats in London at that election.

He contested the seat again in 1997, this time being elected as its Liberal Democrat MP with a majority of 2,097. Burstow joined several other new Liberal Democrat MPs, for the party gained many other south-west London seats at that election.

He made his maiden speech on 16 May 1997, speaking passionately about the needs of blind and disabled people. On his election, Burstow immediately became a party spokesman on the Environment under Paddy Ashdown. He became the spokesman on Social Security in 1999, on the election of Charles Kennedy as the Leader of the Liberal Democrats.

After the 2001 general election, Burstow became the Health spokesman for the Liberal Democrats. He was promoted to the Liberal Democrat Shadow Cabinet as the Shadow Secretary of State for Health in 2003. He stepped down from the Liberal Democrat Shadow Cabinet following the 2005 general election, but was appointed as the spokesman on London. On 22 March 2006, Liberal Democrat MPs elected him their Chief Whip. In that role he oversaw a number of reforms of the whips operation.

In 2003, The Guardian described Burstow as "One of the most knowledgeable and effective politicians on older people's issues". He was voted by MPs as older people's champion in the epolitix Charity Champion awards in December 2005.

Minister of State
At the 2010 general election Burstow was re-elected MP for Sutton and Cheam with a slim majority of 1,608 votes. He was then appointed Minister of State in the Department of Health in the coalition government. He was responsible for care services and the elderly, long term conditions and mental health.  He was responsible for developing the Government's mental health strategy and drafting the care provisions of the Care Act.  Burstow left the government in September 2012, and was succeeded as Care Minister by Norman Lamb.

Subsequent career
Between 2012 and 2015, when he left Parliament, Burstow led a number of influential policy commissions.  Working with the think tank Demos Demos he led a commission into the future models of residential care for people in later life.

He was appointed Chair of the Tavistock and Portman NHS Foundation Trust from November 2015 to June 2022.  He was also invited to become a Trustee of Action on Smoking and Health in 2015 stepping down in 2022.

In 2016 he became a part-time professor of mental health policy at the University of Birmingham where he led a policy commission which made recommendations for a public health approach to improving the mental health and wellbeing of children and young people, Investing in a Resilient Generation.

Burstow's interest in social care saw him appointed as Chair of the Social Care Institute for Excellence in July 2017 where he has worked to refresh the board of Trustees, appoint a new Chief Executive and develop the organisation's business strategy and deliver a financial turnaround .

He was appointed as chair of the charity St Andrew's Healthcare in September 2020.  At the charity he has reshaped and strengthened the Board, appointed a new Chief Executive and promoted collaborative working with NHS mental health providers in the East and West Midlands to address a number of longstanding quality challenges.

In 2022 Burstow was appointed as one of the 42 Integrated Care Board Chairs.  He has helped to shape the system partnership across Hertfordshire and West Essex and overseen the appointment of the new Board and is working with local government, NHS and CVFSE partners to develop a 10 year strategy and 5 year joint plan to improve the health and wellbeing of the local population.

Personal life
He married Mary Burstow, a Liberal Democrat councillor for Cheam, in 1995; they have a son and two daughters. His interests include cooking, reading, and walking.

References

External links
 Paul Burstow MP official constituency website
 Profile at the Liberal Democrats

Alumni of London South Bank University
Liberal Democrats (UK) MPs for English constituencies
UK MPs 1997–2001
UK MPs 2001–2005
UK MPs 2005–2010
Councillors in the London Borough of Sutton
1962 births
Living people
Members of the Privy Council of the United Kingdom
People from Carshalton
UK MPs 2010–2015
Social Democratic Party (UK) politicians
Liberal Democrats (UK) councillors